Kuppathu Raja is a 1979 Indian Tamil-language film, directed by T. R. Ramanna. The film stars Rajinikanth, Vijayakumar, Manjula Vijayakumar and Padmapriya. It is a remake of the 1972 Hindi film Do Yaar.

Kuppathu Raja was released in theatres on 12 January 1979, Pongal day along with Kamal Haasan's Neeya?. Although it was appreciated for Rajinikanth's style and acting, the film became a commercial failure during its release.

Plot

Cast 
Rajinikanth as Jakku / Jayakumar
Vijayakumar as Selvam
Manjula Vijayakumar  as Mynaa
Padmapriya as Kasthuri
S. A. Ashokan as Govind
Vennira Aadai Moorthy as Nallakannu
Manorama as Pavunu
C. I. D. Sakunthala as Dancer
Loose Mohan as Drunkard
Typist Gopu

Soundtrack 
All songs were written by Kannadasan and composed by M. S. Viswanathan.

Reception 
P. S. M. of Kalki said the film could be watched for Rajinikanth's performance.

References

External links 
 

1970s Tamil-language films
1979 films
Films directed by T. R. Ramanna
Films scored by M. S. Viswanathan
Tamil remakes of Hindi films